Robert Paton is the name of:

 Robert Paton (footballer) (c. 1854–1905), Scottish footballer
 Robert Paton (politician) (1839–1917), Canadian politician and merchant
 Robert Paton (chemist) (fl. 2015)
 Robert Thomson Paton (1856–1929), Australian public health official

See also
 Robert M. Patton (1809–1885), American politician